Casco Township is a civil township of St. Clair County in the U.S. state of Michigan.  As of the 2020 Census, the township population was 3,990.

History
Casco Township was established in 1849.

Communities
There are four unincorporated communities within the Township:
The settlement of this location began circa 1840. It was a station on the Michigan Central Railway and was named by an English contractor who built the branch of the railway here.
The first white settlers began arriving in the area before 1840. The township was organized in 1849 and is believed to be named after Casco, Maine, by Captain John Clarke, a transplanted native of that state. A post office operated there from 1854 until 1907.
It was so named because it was the principal slaughterhouse for what was predominantly a sheep raising area.
It was originally called "Petersburg" after an early settler, John Peters. Because there was another post office named Petersburg in Michigan, the post office here was named simply "Peters" and operated from 1891 until 1905.

Geography

Demographics
As of the census of 2000, there were 4,747 people, 1,634 households, and 1,294 families residing in the township. The racial makeup of the township was 96.57% White, 0.51% African American, 0.25% Native American, 0.17% Asian, 0.08% Pacific Islander, 0.17% from other races, and 2.25% from two or more races. Hispanic or Latino of any race were 0.93% of the population.

There were 1,634 households, out of which 38.4% had children under the age of 18 living with them, 64.5% were married couples living together, 9.2% had a female householder with no husband present, and 20.8% were non-families. 16.3% of all households were made up of individuals, and 5.0% had someone living alone who was 65 years of age or older.  The average household size was 2.91 and the average family size was 3.24.

In the township the population was spread out, with 28.4% under the age of 18, 8.5% from 18 to 24, 31.8% from 25 to 44, 24.4% from 45 to 64, and 6.9% who were 65 years of age or older.  The median age was 35 years. For every 100 females, there were 103.0 males.  For every 100 females age 18 and over, there were 103.2 males.

The median income for a household in the township was $52,961, and the median income for a family was $60,598. Males had a median income of $51,042 versus $28,667 for females. The per capita income for the township was $22,299.  None of the families and 1.6% of the population were living below the poverty line, including no under eighteens and 3.6% of those over 64.

External links
NEMC-TV6: Casco Township Public-access television cable TV Channel website

References

Notes

Sources

Townships in St. Clair County, Michigan
1849 establishments in Michigan
Townships in Michigan